John Charles Seaden (born 4 June 1967) is an English former footballer who played as a midfielder.

Club career
Seaden came through the youth ranks at Southend United, making 18 appearances for the club in the Football League, scoring once. Following his time at Southend, Seaden played for Chelmsford City and Barking.

Managerial career
During the 1990s, Seaden managed Essex Senior League club Southend Manor.

Personal life
Seaden's son, Harry, played in the Football League for Southend and also represented England under-17's.

References

1967 births
Living people
Association football midfielders
English footballers
English football managers
Sportspeople from Southend-on-Sea
Southend United F.C. players
Chelmsford City F.C. players
Barking F.C. players
Stambridge United F.C. players
English Football League players
Southend Manor F.C. managers